Rad50 may refer to:

  RADIX-50, a character encoding scheme in computing
 RAD50 (gene), in biology, encodes a DNA repair protein involved in DNA double-strand break (DSB) repair